Almost Married is a 1942 American comedy musical film directed by Charles Lamont and starring Jane Frazee.

Cast
Jane Frazee as Gloria Dobson
Robert Paige as James Manning, lll
Eugene Pallette as Doctor Dobson
Elizabeth Patterson as Aunt Matilda Manning
Charles Coleman as Michael, Manning's Butler
Maude Eburne as Mrs. Clayton
Olin Howland as Bright
William A. Lee as Hurley 
Mary Forbes as Mrs. Marvin
Lionel Pape (in his last film role) as Mr. Marvin
Slim Gaillard and Slam Stewart as themselves (Slim and Slam)

External links
 

1942 films
Films directed by Charles Lamont
American black-and-white films
1942 musical comedy films
1942 romantic comedy films
Universal Pictures films
American romantic musical films
American musical comedy films
1940s romantic musical films
1940s English-language films
1940s American films